The Community of Christ, known from 1872 to 2001 as the Reorganized Church of Jesus Christ of Latter Day Saints (RLDS), is an American-based international church, and is the second-largest denomination in the Latter Day Saint movement. The church reports 250,000 members in 1,100 congregations in 59 countries. The church traces its origins to Joseph Smith's establishment of the Church of Christ on April 6, 1830. His eldest son Joseph Smith III formally accepted leadership of the church on April 6, 1860 in the aftermath of the 1844 death of Joseph Smith.

Although Community of Christ is a Restorationist faith expression, various practices and beliefs are congruent with mainline Protestant Christianity. While it generally rejects the term Mormon to describe its members, the church abides by a number of theological distinctions relatively unique to Mormonism, including but not limited to: ongoing prophetic leadership, a priesthood polity, the use of the Book of Mormon and the Doctrine and Covenants as scripture, belief in the cause of Zion, the building of temples, and an interpretation of the Word of Wisdom. In many respects, the church differs from the larger Church of Jesus Christ of Latter-day Saints (LDS Church) and most other Latter Day Saint denominations in its religious liberalism, belief in the traditional conception of the trinity (as opposed to a godhead of three separate and distinct beings), and rejection of exaltation and the plan of salvation. Salvation is considered a personal matter and not subject to dogma, but salvation by grace alone is emphasized. The church considers itself to be non-creedal and accepts people with a wide range of beliefs. Church teachings emphasize that "all are called" as "persons of worth" to "share the peace of Christ".

Community of Christ worship follows a free-form worship placing more of the foundation on scripture based on the Revised Common Lectionary. From its headquarters in Independence, Missouri, the church offers a special focus on evangelism, peace and justice ministries, spirituality and wholeness, youth ministries and outreach ministries.

History

Formerly known as the Reorganized Church of Jesus Christ of Latter Day Saints, the Community of Christ regards itself as the true embodiment of the original church organized in 1830 by Joseph Smith, and it regards Joseph Smith III, the eldest surviving son of Smith, to have been his legitimate successor. The church was "legally organized on April 6, 1830, in Fayette, New York". The formal reorganization occurred on April 6, 1860, in Amboy, Illinois, as the "Church of Jesus Christ of Latter Day Saints", adding the word Reorganized to the church name in 1872. The church was founded based on a pattern of lineal succession through Joseph Smith of Prophet/presidents of the church, and as a mainstream alternative to the Strangites and the larger LDS church led by Brigham Young. It has long history as a Midwestern wing of the Latter Day Saint movement. It also had a long history of vocal opposition to plural marriage within the Latter Day Saint movement.

Community of Christ considers the period from 1830 to 1844 to be a part of its early history and from 1844, the year of the death of the prophet-founder, to 1860, to be a period of disorganization. Since 1844, the doctrines and practices of the Community of Christ have evolved separately from the other denominations of the Latter Day Saint movement.

Changes in beliefs and practices 
Since the 1960s, the church's proselytizing outside North America have caused a re-assessment and gradual evolution of its traditional practices and beliefs.

A revelation presented by Wallace B. Smith in 1984 decreed the construction of the Independence Temple and the ordination of women to the priesthood, after long-standing calls for both. Following the retirement of Smith as Prophet-President of the Church, W. Grant McMurray was appointed as the new President. Although McMurray had been designated prophet-president by Smith, some members objected because he was the first church president who was not a direct descendant of Joseph Smith, which they considered to be a distinguishing trait from other denominations of the Latter Day Saint movement.

These changes, among others, were controversial among the membership, and they led to the formation of breakaway churches such as the Remnant Church of Jesus Christ of Latter Day Saints; in 1994, former church historian Richard P. Howard estimated that 25,000 members had left to join such groups. Between the mid-1960s and the late 1990s, there was a one-third decline in new baptisms in the United States along with a 50 percent drop in contributions in the decade before 1998. The decline in membership was offset somewhat by an increase in converts outside the United States. Growth continues to be driven by missions outside the US, particularly in the developing world and in Australia. In recent years, the church has attracted many ex-Mormons.

The vision and mission statements of the Community of Christ were adopted in 1996 by the leading quorums of the church's leadership and reflect the peace and justice centered ministries of the denomination. In its mission statement, the church declares that "[w]e proclaim Jesus Christ and promote communities of joy, hope, love and peace." The vision statement states that "We will become a worldwide church dedicated to the pursuit of peace, reconciliation, and healing of the spirit."

Temples and historical sites
The church owns two temples: the Kirtland Temple, dedicated in 1836 in Kirtland, Ohio (operated in part as a historic site as part of its educational ministry), and the relatively new Independence Temple, which serves as the church's headquarters in Independence, Missouri. These structures are open to the public and are also used for education and gatherings. The church also owns and operates some Latter Day Saint historic sites in Lamoni, Iowa, and Plano and Nauvoo, Illinois. The Auditorium in Independence houses the Children's Peace Pavilion and is the site of the major legislative assembly of the Community of Christ, which convenes during the World Conference. The church sponsors Graceland University, with a campus in Lamoni and another in Independence, where the School of Nursing and the Community of Christ Seminary are based.

Teachings and practices

The Community of Christ states that it recognizes that "perception of truth is always qualified by human nature and experience" and it therefore has not adopted an official religious creed. Nevertheless, the Community of Christ offers a number of the commonly held beliefs of its members and leaders as the "generally accepted beliefs of the church." As Stephen M. Veazey, president of the church states, "Community of Christ is a church that provides light for the way as well as space for the personal faith journey."

The Community of Christ generally accepts the doctrine of the Trinity and other commonly held Christian beliefs. The concept of Zion as both a present reality of Christian living and as a hoped for community of the future is a rather strongly held belief in the Community of Christ and it ties closely to the peace and justice emphasis of the denomination. The movement also differs from most other Christian faiths in its belief in prophetic leadership, in the Book of Mormon, and in an open canon of scripture recorded in its version of the Doctrine and Covenants, which is regularly appended.

God, Jesus Christ, and the Holy Spirit
The Community of Christ teaches that the "one eternal living God is triune.” It acknowledges God, who is a community of three persons, as the Creator and the Source of love, life, and truth. It states that "[t]his God alone is worthy of worship.” Jesus Christ is described as both Savior and as a living expression of God and is acknowledged as having lived, died, and been resurrected. As the name of the denomination implies, Jesus Christ is central to its members' study and worship. The Community of Christ's Theology Task Force states that "Jesus Christ is the Word made flesh, both fully human and fully divine.” The Holy Spirit is described as the "continuing presence of God in the world" and as the source of divine inspiration.

Peace
The Independence and Kirtland Temples are places of education and worship for all people. In keeping with the Community of Christ's role as a "peace and justice church," the Independence Temple was "dedicated to the pursuit of peace". Every day at 1 pm a Daily Prayer for Peace is held in the sanctuary of the Independence Temple. Each day at 1 pm Eastern Time the Daily Prayer for Peace is held at the Community of Christ Spiritual Formation Center portion of the Kirtland Temple Complex. The church's peace position was influenced by the Mennonite Central Committee Peace and Justice Education Associate. In addition, the Community of Christ International Peace Award has been bestowed annually since 1993 (except 1996). The call to "peace, reconciliation, and healing of the spirit" is a recurring theme of the Community of Christ and is reflected in its official vision statement. Doctrinal statements by the church suggest that "because of our commitment to Christ and belief in the worth of all people and the value of community building, we dedicate our lives to the pursuit of peace and justice for all people." The church maintains a Peace and Justice Ministries Office at its headquarters which is designed to provide resources, education and networking. The Peace Colloquy is a major conference on peace held annually at the Community of Christ headquarters. The Community of Christ promotes the Young Peacemakers Club as a means of teaching and promoting peace among children all over the world. In 2008, the church organized an additional 501(c)3 organization called the Peace Support Network whose stated purpose is to "build a global movement which provides individuals the opportunity to join together based upon passion, calling, and that which resonates within them, rather than be constrained by the limitations of circumstance and geography."

"Worth of all persons"
The Community of Christ states that "God loves each of us equally and unconditionally. All persons have great worth and should be respected as creations of God with basic human rights. The willingness to love and the acceptance of others is essential to faithfulness to the gospel of Christ." Recognizing that scripture has sometimes been used to marginalize and oppress classes of persons, the church accepted this statement into the Doctrine and Covenants in 2007: "It is not pleasing to God when any passage of scripture is used to oppress races, genders, or classes of human beings. Many violent acts have been committed against some of God's beloved children through the misuse of scripture. The church is called to confess and repent of such attitudes and practices."

Revelation and prophetic leadership

The belief in continuing divine revelation is a distinctive aspect of the church. The Community of Christ states that "[t]he process through which God reveals divine will and love is called revelation. God continues to reveal today as in the past. God is revealed to us through scripture, the faith community, prayer, nature, and in human history."

The president of the Community of Christ is sometimes referred to by the titles of Prophet or Prophet-President. The president of the church acts as a prophet when bringing occasional inspired counsel or inspired documents to the church. These are usually brief passages of text which bring encouragement, counsel and direction to the church. When an inspired document is presented to the World Conference by the president of the church, an elaborate review process takes place. Each quorum of the church and several caucuses review the document and vote upon it. The quorums typically vote heavily in favor of the documents and sometimes unanimously. Debate is allowed, however, and the body has been known to refer the inspired document back to the president for further reflection or for clarification. When the document comes to the floor of the World Conference for debate, the president retires from the room to allow for more impartial consideration. The World Conference may vote to include the document as a new section of the Doctrine and Covenants, which is regarded as scripture by the denomination. If the delegates at the World Conference do approve an inspired document, it is the custom of the church to then have a courtesy vote, which is opened to all non-delegates attending the conference. This is the only time non-delegates are permitted to vote on World Conference business. Through this action, the president of the church can be assured that a large representation of the church membership supports the inspired document.

Concept of Zion
The concept of Zion in the Community of Christ relates to a theology of the "kingdom of God". As a doctrine, it is therefore closely founded upon the kingdom parables of Jesus as recorded in the four gospels. Based on references in the Bible to Mt. Zion or simply Zion, it was initially regarded as a city, sometimes called the New Jerusalem. Prior to 1920, most members of the RLDS Church identified Independence, Missouri, as Zion or the New Jerusalem. As New Testament understandings of basileia, as the realm or the domain of God, have gradually taken root among members of the denomination, Zion is now understood more as a cause, as a way of living or as a state of existence, and is usually not regarded as having its foundation in a specific place. Officially, the denomination states that "[t]he 'cause of Zion' expresses our commitment to pursuing God's kingdom through the establishment of Christ-centered communities in families, congregations, neighborhoods, cities, and throughout the world." While the Concept of Zion is rarely associated with the Jewish concept of Zionism, some members of the RLDS Church from Maine, intrigued by the doctrine of Zion, established a refugee center near Tel Aviv during the initial return of the Jewish diaspora to Israel in the early 1900s.

"All are called"
The Community of Christ commonly attests that "all are called according to the gifts of God unto them" (D&C 119:8b). Published statements of belief proclaim that "[a]ll men, women, youth, and children are given gifts and abilities to enhance life and to become involved in Christ's mission. Some are called to fulfill a particular responsibility as ordained ministers (priesthood) in the church. The church provides for a wide range of priesthood ministries through the calling and ordination of both men and women."

Priesthood
Nearly one in ten members of the church hold a priesthood office. These are primarily unpaid bi-vocational ministers. The church does maintain a relatively small group of professional ministers who typically serve as administrators, financial officers or missionaries. Priesthood members are called to teach and preach the gospel or "good news" of Jesus Christ. The ministry of the church at the congregational level is led by priesthood members and is carried out by all members of the priesthood and the laity. In most congregations the pastors and other elected and appointed leadership positions are unpaid positions. The right of women to hold the priesthood was recognized by a church conference in 1984.

Salvation
The Community of Christ Theology Task Force offers theological statements on the principle of salvation for the consideration of members, but the denomination does not expect strict doctrinal adherence on such matters of belief. The task force presents the view that salvation and eternal life are gifts and that by baptism and discipleship lived as a response to the gospel, individuals become new people.

Stewardship
The "Disciples' Generous Response" (or "A Disciple's Generous Response") was announced in April 2002 as the name given by the Community of Christ to a major rethinking of its stewardship theology and practices. Prior to this program, members of the Community of Christ were taught that a stewardship principle known as "increase" determined the base amount for tithing to be paid to the church.

Based in part on teachings by writers such as Walter Brueggemann and Leonard Sweet, the Disciple's Generous Response can be traced to a theology or liturgy of abundance, as well as the principle of receiving God's abundance. Like many recent enhancements of church doctrine and practice, it is described as belonging to a postmodernism trend in thinking within the church. While carefully built upon the many differing stewardship principles in both overall Christian and specific Community of Christ traditions, the new thinking emphasizes a natural generosity in all of life lived as response to the overwhelming and incomparable generosity of God. As such, tithing is not limited to World Church giving as in the past, or even to the church at all. Through the principle of community tithes, almost any charitable organization to which a disciple contributes could be considered tithing. While most giving is now seen as tithing, the typical interpretation is that a majority of one's tithing should be given in Mission Tithes (Tithes to Local and World Church) and the minority to Community Tithes (Organizations like Outreach International, Graceland University, Restoration Trails Foundation, World Accord, etc.) The church teaches the principle of community tithes believing that it will not decrease giving to the church, but rather increase it as more members embrace a fully generous and responsive way of living.

The new stewardship thinking in the Disciples' Generous Response is referred to indirectly in the book of Doctrine and Covenants 162:7c as "the principle of generosity, rightly interpreted for a new time." The six principles of the Disciples' Generous Response call on Christian disciples to practice generosity as a spiritual discipline, respond faithfully to the blessings of God, to give financially as appropriate to our unique personal circumstances and desires, to share in mission tithes and community tithes, to save wisely for the future and to spend responsibly. Responsibility for interpretation and teaching of the Disciples' Generous Response lies principally with the Presiding Bishopric.

Sacraments

Members commonly believe that sacraments (or ordinances) express the abiding presence of God in the life of the church, its members and priesthood. Sacraments are considered metaphorical acts designed to create and renew a person's spiritual relationship with God. Sacraments are viewed as covenants with God in response to God's grace. The Community of Christ practices eight sacraments: baptism, confirmation, blessing of children, The Lord's Supper, marriage, ministration to the sick, ordination, and Evangelist's Blessing. Laying on of hands is used in confirmation, ordination, the blessing of children, ministration to the sick, and Evangelist's blessing.

Scripture
The Community of Christ points to Jesus Christ as the living Word of God and it affirms the Bible (including but not limited to the Inspired Version of the Holy Scriptures) along with the Book of Mormon and the Doctrine and Covenants, as scripture for the church. The Community of Christ view of scripture is that it should be "reasonably interpreted and faithfully applied." Scripture references provided for congregational worship generally follow the Revised Common Lectionary. The church views the Book of Mormon and the Doctrine and Covenants as "additional witnesses of Christ's ministry and God's love." The Community of Christ understands scripture as an inspired record of God's activity with humanity. While it recognizes scripture as the revelation of God, its members would not typically suggest that scriptures constitute the literal "words of God." In words of counsel to the church brought by church president Stephen M. Veazey in 2007 and now included in Section 163 of the Doctrine and Covenants, it is suggested that "[s]cripture is an indispensable witness to the Eternal Source of light and truth, which cannot be contained in any finite vessel or language. Scripture has been written and shaped by human authors through experiences of revelation and ongoing inspiration of the Holy Spirit in the midst of time and culture. Scripture is not to be worshipped or idolized. Only God, the Eternal One of whom scripture testifies, is worthy of worship. God's nature, as revealed in Jesus Christ and affirmed by the Holy Spirit, provides the ultimate standard by which any portion of scripture should be interpreted and applied."

Scripture has been given a place in the Community of Christ theology. Doctrine and Covenants 163 states: "Scripture, prophetic guidance, knowledge, and discernment in the faith community must walk hand in hand to reveal the true will of God." The Community of Christ's Theology Task Force has produced nine affirmations regarding scripture, the preamble of which states: "Scripture provides divine guidance and inspired insight for life when responsibly interpreted and faithfully applied. Scripture helps us believe in Jesus Christ. Its witness guides us to eternal life and enables us to grow spiritually, to transform our lives, and to participate actively in the life and ministry of the church."

Bible
In unity with Christianity, the Community of Christ upholds the Bible as scripture. Adherents read and reference both the Hebrew Old Testament and the Christian New Testament in public worship as well as in private study. The church encourages prayerful meditation upon the meaning and the importance of Bible passages. "If any of you is lacking in wisdom, ask God, who gives to all generously and ungrudgingly, and it will be given you. But ask in faith, never doubting" (James 1:5–6) is an oft quoted passage from the New Testament, as well as being the scripture reference that Joseph Smith read when he was trying, as a boy, to determine what church to join. His experience following his reading of this scripture resulted in the eventual organization of the Church of Christ.

The Community of Christ does not prescribe a single translation of the Bible. Although Smith began a project to revise the King James Version by inspiration during his lifetime, the liturgy of the church today is usually based on more recent translations of the Bible. Upon Smith's death, the working manuscript of his translation was retained by his family and came into the possession of the Community of Christ. The work was edited and is published by the church as the Inspired Version of the Bible. Since it largely relies on the language of the King James Version, most official publications of the Community of Christ quote scripture from newer versions such as the New Revised Standard Version (NRSV). The Community of Christ does not view scripture, including the Bible, as inerrant. Members are encouraged to understand the historical and literary context of Bible passages and are not required to interpret all of the language literally.

Book of Mormon

The Community of Christ views the Book of Mormon as an additional witness of Jesus Christ and publishes two versions of the book through its official publishing arm, Herald House. The Authorized Edition is based on the original printer's manuscript and the 1837 Second Edition (or Kirtland Edition) of the Book of Mormon. Its content is similar to the Book of Mormon published by the Church of Jesus Christ of Latter-day Saints (LDS Church), but the versification is different. The Community of Christ also publishes a 1966 "Revised Authorized Edition" which attempts to modernize some of the language.

In 2001, church president W. Grant McMurray reflected on increasing questions about the Book of Mormon: "The proper use of the Book of Mormon as sacred scripture has been under wide discussion in the 1970s and beyond, in part because of long-standing questions about its historicity and in part because of perceived theological inadequacies, including matters of race and ethnicity." In the introduction he qualified his statements: "I cannot speak for each person within our community, but perhaps I can say some words on behalf of our community."

At the 2007 Community of Christ World Conference, church president Stephen M. Veazey ruled as out of order a resolution to "reaffirm the Book of Mormon as a divinely inspired record". In so doing he stated that "while the Church affirms the Book of Mormon as scripture, and makes it available for study and use in various languages, we do not attempt to mandate the degree of belief or use. This position is in keeping with our longstanding tradition that belief in the Book of Mormon is not to be used as a test of fellowship or membership in the church."

The Community of Christ's official stance has stated about the Book of Mormon (under Affirmation Nine):
"With other Christians, we affirm the Bible as the foundational scripture for the church. In addition, the Community of Christ uses the Book of Mormon and the Doctrine and Covenants as scripture. We do not use these sacred writings to replace the witness of the Bible or improve upon it, but because they confirm its message that Jesus Christ is the Living Word of God (Preface of the Book of Mormon; Doctrine and Covenants 76: 3g). We have heard Christ speak in all three books of scripture, and bear witness that he is 'alive forever and ever' (Revelation 1:18)."

Book of Doctrine and Covenants
The Community of Christ edition of the Doctrine and Covenants is a growing work of scripture containing inspired documents given through the prophet-presidents recognized by the Community of Christ. It contains inspirational Christian messages such as this passage shared by former President, W. Grant McMurray as inspired counsel: "Open your hearts and feel the yearnings of your brothers and sisters who are lonely, despised, fearful, neglected, unloved. Reach out in understanding, clasp their hands, and invite all to share in the blessings of community created in the name of the One who suffered on behalf of all." (Doctrine and Covenants 161:3a)

Church president Stephen Veazey presented words of counsel to the membership, which were accepted as scripture on March 30, 2007. This document, now officially Section 163 of the Doctrine and Covenants, further challenges the Community of Christ's membership to engage in ministries that foster peace, and are specifically charged to "pursue peace" and to "strive to be faithful to Christ’s vision of the peaceable Kingdom of God on earth".

On January 17, 2010, Veazey presented his second revelation, which was officially approved as Section 164 in April 2010. This document enables the church to accept new members previously baptized in other churches via the sacrament of confirmation, instead of having to be re-baptized (although they may be re-baptized if they so wish). The counsel also encourages all church members to periodically reflect upon the meaning of their own baptisms; as well as providing clarification on open communion. In addition, the church is called to more directly confront global concerns of an ethical nature. Finally, the document authorized the church leadership to adjust the number of missionary quorums of the church to align with the particular needs of the church as they may exist.

Lectionary usage
The Community of Christ employs a three-year lectionary cycle based upon the Revised Common Lectionary (RCL) used by other Christian traditions. The readings from the biblical canon are those of the RCL except where the Inspired Version differs in versification from other biblical canons. In these instances verses from the RCL are given along with the corresponding verses of the Inspired Version. In addition, the church has added readings from the Book of Mormon and the Doctrine and Covenants, however after feedback and to allow flexibility the church stopped using the 3-year cycle for Book of Mormon and Doctrine and Covenants readings and now these readings are chosen by the author(s) of the Worship Helps published each year and are to be tied to the chosen theme for that Sunday. Worship helps based on the lectionary are published by the Herald House as well as posted on the official denominational website and they include sample orders of worship with recommended hymns from the official denominational hymnal, Community of Christ Sings.

Ecumenism and interfaith activities
The Community of Christ has made efforts to reconcile with traditional Christianity and to reach out to other Christians. The Community of Christ frequently notes that it has never sanctioned polygamy; it has always ordained persons of any race; it has no required creedal statement, asking only that people profess faith in Christ as a condition for baptism; it has accepted Trinitarian doctrine; it has been in dialogue with the National Council of Churches (NCC), the World Council of Churches (WCC), and Christian Churches Together; and it has practiced open communion since 1994. On November 10, 2010, the Community of Christ was unanimously approved for membership by the National Council of Churches, becoming the 37th member communion of this ecumenical body.

In its World Conference in 2002, a committee on "Ecumenical/Interfaith Relations" was established to explore the possibility of entering into the membership of the WCC. In its report for the 2004 World Conference, the committee concluded that while there was an openness to further meetings and discussions, there were concerns about several issues including new entrance criteria based on theology and the Community of Christ's acceptance of extra-biblical scriptures. The report states that this warrants caution in their approach, but the dialogue would continue.

Women's participation
The church's priesthood was opened to women in 1984. In 1998, Gail E. Mengel and Linda L. Booth became the first two women apostles in the church. At the 2007 World Conference of the church, Becky L. Savage was ordained as the first woman to serve in the First Presidency. In 2013, Linda L. Booth became the first woman elected to serve as president of the Council of Twelve. In 2016, Stassi D. Cramm became the first woman presiding bishop of the church and Jane M. Gardner became the church's first female presiding evangelist.

LGBTQ participation
The church is accepting of same-sex relationships.

For a period of time, the church under the presidency of W. Grant McMurray allowed the priesthood ordination of practicing homosexuals, something which he acknowledged was already occurring. The church would later halt this practice, prohibiting the ordination of sexually active homosexuals. However, the church allows those who were ordained against policy to continue in priesthood office.

In 2012, the Community of Christ held national conferences in Canada and Australia both of which recommended to church leadership to change standing policies regarding ordination to include those in same-sex marriage (Canada) and in marriage-like same-sex committed relationships (Australia), and in Canada to extend the sacrament of marriage to same-sex couples. Official policy changes for these nations have since been released that follow the recommendations of these conferences.

The Community of Christ's 2013 USA National Conference like those in Canada and Australia recommended changes. Those changes were recommended for the extension of the sacrament of marriage to same-sex couples in states where same-sex marriages are legal, the extension of covenant commitment services for same-sex couples in states where same-sex marriages are not yet legal, and extending eligibility for the priesthood call sacrament to all church members regardless of sexual orientation or open same-sex relationship. As a result of these recommendations, church leadership released in March 2014 policy embracing the recommendations for the church in the United States.

Ireland and Great Britain held a special multi-nation conference in 2013 which also recommended changes to policy similar to those of Canada, Australia, and the United States. The changes have yet to be approved by the First Presidency and Council of Twelve for Ireland and Great Britain, with the likely time-frame to "develop, approve, and implement interim policies" being up to one year after the 2013 Conferences.

A petition by the Australia Mission Centre Council to permit same-sex marriages was approved by the First Presidency in 2017.

Organization and structure

The Community of Christ is led by a First Presidency, consisting of a president and two counselors. The president is regarded as a prophet. The church's ministry is overseen by a Council of Twelve Apostles and the financial concerns of the church are overseen by the Presiding Bishopric. Meeting together, these three quorums are known as the World Church Leadership Council.

Other key leadership positions include Presiding Evangelist, Senior President of the Presidents of Seventy, President of the High Priests Quorum, and Ecumenical and Interfaith Officer. Every three years (formerly two, until a change made in 2007), delegates from around the world meet together with these leaders to vote on church business in World Conference.

The Community of Christ has 250,000 members in 1,100 congregations in 59 countries according to the most recent report.  Membership is distributed as 30,000 in Africa, 9,000 in Asia, 8,000 in Canada, 13,250 in the Caribbean, 2,500 in Europe, 12,250 in the Pacific and Australia, 4,500 in Central and South America, and 117,000 in the United States according to the 2016 World Conference Bulletin.

The church is officially established in these countries and territories: Argentina, Australia, Belgium, Bolivia, Brazil, Canada, the Cayman Islands, Chile, Colombia, Ivory Coast, Democratic Republic of the Congo, Dominican Republic, El Salvador, Fiji, France, French Polynesia, Germany, Guam, Guatemala, Haiti, Honduras, Hungary, India, Jamaica, Japan, Kenya, Korea, Liberia, Malawi, Mexico, the Netherlands, New Caledonia, New Zealand, Nigeria, Norway, Papua New Guinea, Peru, the Philippines, Republic of the Congo, South Africa, Spain, Sri Lanka, Switzerland, Taiwan, Ukraine, the United Kingdom, the United States, Venezuela, Zambia, and Zimbabwe.

It is estimated that more than half of the active members of the church speak a primary language other than English. The church translates resources into French, Spanish, Portuguese, Russian, Telugu, Kwi, Sora, Tahitian, Chewa, Chibemba, Efik, Lingala and Swahili.

For the purposes of church organization and administration, the church has divided the world into geographical areas termed fields (which can include areas that are not adjoining, such as Australia and parts of Canada). Each field is presided over by a member of the Council of Twelve Apostles, who are collectively overseen by a member of the First Presidency, in his or her capacity of Director of Field Ministries (this role was previously held by the President of the Council of Twelve but followed the outgoing president when he joined the First Presidency in 2013). Fields are further divided into multiple Mission Centers, which succeeded the former jurisdictional units known as stakes and regions (which were each further divided into the now abolished level of district). Each mission center is presided over by a president, holding the office of high priest. Mission centers are composed of congregations, presided over by a pastor or co-pastors.

The organizational fields are: Africa and Haiti Mission Field, Asia Mission Field, Canada and Australia Mission Field, Caribbean–Mexico Mission Field, Central and South America Mission Field, Eurasia Mission Field, North Central USA/Canada Mission Field, North East USA Mission Field, Pacific Mission Field, South Central USA Mission Field, Southern USA Mission Field and Western USA Mission Field.

Criticisms
Mormon scholars, including members of the Community of Christ, have sometimes described the church as "adrift", not being distinctively Mormon enough, but not completely mainline either. The church has made a long-standing effort to de-mythologize its past, for example, by taking a pragmatic view of the Book of Mormon and Joseph Smith, both of which the church now views as inspired but imperfect. Historian Ken Mulliken has argued that this has led to a policy of "historical amnesia", resulting in a church that has abandoned its past and created a new organization that is focused on social-interaction (Community) and shared mission (Christ).

See also

Plano Stone Church
Comparison of the Community of Christ and The Church of Jesus Christ of Latter-day Saints
List of churches in the Latter Day Saint Reorganization movement

References

Citations

Works cited

Other sources
Community of Christ, "The Priesthood Manual, 2004 Edition", Herald House, 2004. 
Community of Christ, "Church Administrators' Handbook: 2005 Edition", Herald House, 2005. 
Community of Christ, "World Conference Resolutions: 2002 Edition", Herald House, 2003. 
Larry W. Conrad and Paul Shupe, “An RLDS Reformation? Construing the Task of RLDS Theology,” Dialogue: A Journal of Mormon Thought 18, no. 2 (1985): 92–103.
Inez Smith Davis, The Story of the Church: A History of the Church of Jesus Christ of Latter Day Saints and of Its Legal Successor, the Reorganized Church of Jesus Christ of Latter Day Saints, 12th edition, Herald House, 1981. 
Roger D. Launius, Joseph III: Pragmatic Prophet, University of Illinois Press: 1995. 
Richard P. Howard, The Church Through the Years, Herald House: 1992. Volume 1: Beginnings to 1860:  Volume 2: 
Jerry Nieft, ed., "Walking with Jesus: A Member's Guide in the Community of Christ", Herald House, 2004. 
William D. Russell, “Defenders of the Faith: Varieties of RLDS Dissent,” Sunstone 14, no. 3 (June 1990): 14–19  (1990).

Further reading
Steven L. Shields, Divergent Paths of the Restoration: a History of the Latter Day Saint Movement, Fourth ed., rev. and enl., Los Angeles: Restoration Research, 1990. 336 p., ill. with b&w photos.

External links

Profile of the Community of Christ on the Association of Religion Data Archives website

 
1860 establishments in Illinois
Christian religious orders established in the 19th century
Independence, Missouri
Josephite denominations in the Latter Day Saint movement
Latter Day Saint movement in the United States
Organizations based in Missouri
Members of the National Council of Churches
Religious organizations established in 1830
Religious organizations established in 1860
1830 establishments in New York (state)